Maucourt is a commune in the Somme department and Hauts-de-France region of northern France.

Geography
Maucourt is situated on the D39 road, about 35 km east-south-east of Amiens.

Population

See also
Communes of the Somme department

References

Communes of Somme (department)